Shugo Imahira (born 2 October 1992) is a Japanese professional golfer. He has played full-time on the Japan Golf Tour since 2015 and has won four times on the tour, between 2017 and 2019. He was the leading money winner on the tour in 2018 and 2019.

Japan Challenge Tour
Imahira won twice on the 2014 Japan Challenge Tour en route to winning the season money list title.

Japan Golf Tour
Since 2015 he has played on the main Japan Golf Tour. In 2015, his best finish was second place in the Shigeo Nagashima Invitational Sega Sammy Cup. In 2016, he tied for second place in the Gateway to The Open Mizuno Open and also had a third-place finish and three fourth-place finishes, finishing 10th in the money list. In 2017, he had his first win on the tour, winning the Kansai Open and finished 6th in the money list. Imahira won the 2018 Bridgestone Open. He was also 2nd three times, 3rd three times and had 7 other top-10 finishes to be the leading money winner on the 2018 Japan Golf Tour.

Majors
Imahira played in the 2016 Open Championship for his first major appearance. He had an opening round 68, but shot 80 in the second round and missed the cut. He qualified for the 2017 U.S. Open and the 2018 PGA Championship but missed the cut on both occasions. Imahira was 53rd in the world rankings at the end of 2018 and missed out on qualification for the 2019 Masters Tournament, for which the top-50 qualified automatically. However, he later received a special invitation for the event. At the 2020 U.S. Open he did make the cut, but finished last among the remaining players.

Amateur wins
this list may be incomplete
2008 Japan Junior Championship (Boy's 15–17 division)

Professional wins (10)

Japan Golf Tour wins (7)

*Note: Tournament shortened to 36/54 holes due to weather.
1Co-sanctioned by the Asian Tour

Japan Golf Tour playoff record (1–1)

Asian Tour wins (1)

1Co-sanctioned by the Japan Golf Tour

Japan Challenge Tour wins (2)

Other wins (1)
2018 Legend Charity Pro-Am

Results in major championships
Results not in chronological order in 2020.

CUT = missed the half-way cut
"T" = tied
NT = No tournament due to the COVID-19 pandemic

Results in World Golf Championships

1Cancelled due to COVID-19 pandemic

QF, R16, R32, R64 = Round in which player lost in match play
DQ = Disqualified
NT = No tournament
"T" = Tied

References

External links

Japanese male golfers
Japan Golf Tour golfers
Sportspeople from Saitama Prefecture
1992 births
Living people